The following is the list of winners and nominees of Apsara best female playback Records: Most awards to female singer, Shreya Ghoshal, was four times.

Superlatives

Winners and Nominees

2000s
 2004 Alka Yagnik - "Oodhni" - Tere Naam
Anuradha Paudwal - "Intezaar" - Paap
Chitra - "Koi Mil Gaya" - Koi Mil Gaya
Sunidhi Chauhan - "Bhaage Re Mann" - Chameli
Vasundhara Das - "It's the time to Disco" - Kal Ho Na Ho
 2005 - No award
 2006 Alisha Chinai - "Kajra Re" Bunty aur Babli
Alka Yagnik - "Hum Tum" - Hum Tum
Shreya Ghosal - "Piyu Bole" - Parineeta
Shubha Mudgal - Bawaaa Mann - Hazaaron Khwaishein Aisi
Sunidhi Chauhan – "Dhoom Machale" - Dhoom
2007 – No award
2008 Shreya Ghoshal - "Barso Re" - Guru
Alisha Chinai - "Its Rocking" - Kya Love Story Hai
Shreya Ghoshal - "Yeh Ishq Haaye" Jab We Met
Sunidhi Chauhan - "Sajna Vaari" - Honeymoon Travels Pvt. Ltd.
Sunidhi Chauhan - "Aaja Nachle" - Aaja Nachle
2009 Shreya Ghoshal - Teri Ore - Singh Is King
 Anupama, Tanvi, Darshana – Pappu Can’t Dance - Jaane Tu Ya Jaane Na
Dominique Cerejo – "Ye Tumhari Meri Baatien" - Rock On!!
Monali Thakur – "Zara Zara Touch Me" - Race
Shreya Ghoshal – Ahista Ahista - Bachna Ae Haseeno

2010s
2010 Shreya Ghoshal - "Tujh Mein Rab Dikhta Hai" - Rab Ne Bana Di Jodi
 Alisha Chinai  – "Tera Hone Laga Hoon" - Ajab Prem Ki Ghazab Kahani
 Shreya Ghoshal – "Aaj Dil Gustak Hai" – Blue
 Sunidhi Chauhan – "Chor Bazari"- Love Aaj Kal
 Suzanne – "Aye Bachoo" – Ghajini
2011 Sunidhi Chauhan - "Sheila Ki Jawani" - Tees Maar Khan and Mamta Sharma - "Munni Badnaam Hui" - Dabangg
Richa Sharma – "Sajda" - My Name is Khan
Sona Mohapatra & Shreya Ghoshal - "Bahaara" - I Hate Luv Storys
Sunidhi Chauhan - "Ainvayi Ainvayi" - Band Baaja Baaraat
Tulsi Kumar - "Tum Jo Aaye" - Once Upon A Time In Mumbaai
2012 Shreya Ghoshal - "Teri Meri" - Bodyguard
Harshdeep Kaur – "Katiya Karu" - Rockstar
Neha Bhasin - "Dhunki" - Mere Brother Ki Dulhan
Shreya Ghoshal - "Saibo" - Shor in the City
Sunidhi Chauhan - "Te Amo" - Dum Maaro Dum
Sunidhi Chauhan - Aa Zara Murder 2
2013 Shalmali Kholgade – "Pareshan" - Ishaqzaade
Hamsika Iyer - "Raabta" (Female Version) – Agent Vinod
Kavita Seth – "Tum Hi Ho Bandhu" - Cocktail
Neeti Mohan - "Ishq Wala Love" - Student Of The Year
Rekha Jha & Khushboo Raa - "Womaniya" - Gangs Of Wasseypur
Shreya Ghoshal – "Saans" - Jab Tak Hai Jaan
Shreya Ghoshal – "Chikni Chameli" - Agneepath
2014 Bhoomi Trivedi – "Ram Chahe Leela" - Goliyon Ki Raasleela: Ram-Leela
Aditi Paul - "Ang Laga De" & "Mor Bani Thanghat Kari" - Goliyon Ki Raasleela: Ram-Leela
Chinmayi - "Main Rang Sharbaton Ka" - Phata Poster Nikhla Hero 
Monali Thakur - "Sawar Loon" - Lootera
Rekha Bhardwaj - "Ghagra" & "Kabira" - Yeh Jawaani Hai Deewani
Sona Mohapatra - "Ambarsariya" - Fukrey 
2015 Kanika Kapoor - "Baby Doll" - Ragini MMS 2
Shreya Ghoshal - "Aa Raat Bhar" - Heropanti
Shreya Ghoshal - "Samjhawan" - Humpty Sharma Ki Dulhania
Shreya Ghoshal - "Manwa Laage" - Happy New Year
Shreya Ghoshal - "Chaar Kadam" - PK
Sultana Nooran, Jyoti Nooran - "Patakha Guddi" - Highway
2016 Monali Thakur – "Moh Moh Ke Dhaage" – Dum Laga Ke Haisha
Sunidhi Chauhan – "Girls Like to Swing" – Dil Dhadakne Do
Palak Muchhal – "Prem Ratan Dhan Payo" – Prem Ratan Dhan Payo
Kanika Kapoor – "Chittiyaan Kalaiyaan" – Roy
Rekha Bhardwaj – "Zinda" – Talvar
Swati Sharma – "Banno" – Tanu Weds Manu Returns
Alka Yagnik – "Agar Tum Saath Ho" – Tamasha
Jyoti Nooran – "Ghani Bawri" – Tanu Weds Manu Returns

See also

 List of music awards honoring women

References

See also
Producers Guild Film Awards
Bollywood

Producers Guild Film Awards
Music awards honoring women